Jutarat Montripila (born October 2, 1986) is a Thai indoor volleyball player. She is a member of the Thailand women's national volleyball team.

Career
In 2018, she played with the local Jakarta Elektrik PLN.

She was on the 2019 list for the Korea-Thailand all star super match competition.

Clubs
  Udon Thani (2008–2011)
  3BB Nakornnont (2011–2013)
  Udon Thani (2013–2014)
  Bangkok Glass (2014–2018)
  BanKo Perlas Spikers (2018)
  Rangsit University (2018–2019)
  Jakarta Elektrik PLN (2018)
  3BB Nakornnont (2019–2021)

Awards

Individual
 2012–13 Thailand League – "Best Spiker"

Clubs
 2011–12 Thailand League –  Champion, with Nakornnonthaburi
 2012–13 Thailand League –  Runner-up, with Nakornnonthaburi
 2014–15 Thailand League –  Champion, with Bangkok Glass
 2015–16 Thailand League –  Champion, with Bangkok Glass
 2016–17 Thailand League –  Runner-up, with Bangkok Glass
 2015 Thai–Denmark Super League –  Champion, with Bangkok Glass
 2016 Thai–Denmark Super League –  Champion, with Bangkok Glass
 2015 Asian Club Championship –  Champion, with Bangkok Glass
 2016 Asian Club Championship –  Bronze medal, with Bangkok Glass
 2018 Premier Volleyball League (Philippines) Reinforced Conference –  Bronze medal, with BanKo Perlas Spikers

References

External links
 FIVB Biography

1986 births
Living people
Jutarat Montripila
Jutarat Montripila
Jutarat Montripila